At the Crossroads is a 1943 Canadian film directed by Jean-Marie Poitevin and written by Paul Guèvremont. The first dramatic feature to be produced by a Quebec religious community, the Société des Missions-Étrangères du Québec, it was narrated by René Lévesque, the future premier of Quebec.

Plot

A young man, Jean Liber (Paul Guèvremont), who, at the end of his cours classique, decides to leave his rich, happy family and his fiancée, Pauline (Denise Pelletier), in order to become a missionary in China. This story of his struggle, 'at the crossroads' between love and God's calling, is clearly a pretext for a film designed to encourage young men to enter missionary work.

Importance
À la croisée des chemins was based on a religious drama by Guy Stein, La folle aventure, which had been staged in 1942 for the 300th anniversary of the founding of Montreal. Canadian film historian Peter Morris wrote: "It [the film] offers a remarkable ideological portrait of Quebec before the Quiet Revolution. Clearly apparent are the values of a lifestyle fostered by a militant Catholic Church: friendship, warmth, and an unproblematic family life. Equally apparent (at least in retrospect) are destructive self-sacrifice, repressed sexuality, and mutually sustaining links between religious and economic establishments."

References

1943 films
History of Catholicism in Quebec
Quebec films
Films about Catholicism
René Lévesque
Canadian black-and-white films
Roman Catholic missionaries in China
Canadian Roman Catholic missionaries
Canadian drama films
1943 drama films
1940s French-language films
French-language Canadian films
1940s Canadian films